Billy Ray (born 1962) is an American screenwriter and film director. He began writing for television and movies in 1994 with Color of Night. He has written numerous films including Captain Phillips (2013) and Richard Jewell (2019).

Biography
Ray was born in Los Angeles, and raised in Encino, Los Angeles, California. He is from a Jewish family, and attended Steven Wise Temple and Birmingham High School. Starting in 2003, he began to direct as well as write; his first film was Shattered Glass, inspired by the true story of Stephen Glass, a journalist who fabricated a majority of his stories.  He was nominated for the Most Promising Filmmaker by the Chicago Film Critics Association and an Independent Spirit Award for Best Screenplay for his work on this film. Breach (2007), which Ray co-wrote and directed, tells a similar story about Robert Hanssen, an FBI agent convicted of spying for the Soviet Union and later, Russia, for more than two decades, and Eric O'Neill, who worked as his assistant and helped bring about his downfall.

He is perhaps best known for writing the screenplay to the 2012 blockbuster, The Hunger Games, and his Academy Award-nominated screenplay for the 2013 film, Captain Phillips. Ray also worked with the advertising agency Barkley to help write the AMC Theatres 2021 "We Make Movies Better" campaign starring Nicole Kidman.

Filmography
Films

Television

References

External links
The Dialogue: Learn from the Masters Interview

Living people
American male writers
American male screenwriters
Jewish American screenwriters
American film directors
American television writers
Place of birth missing (living people)
American male television writers
1962 births
21st-century American Jews